Goodia is a genus of moths in the family Saturniidae that were first described by William Jacob Holland in 1893.

Species
Goodia addita Darge, 2008
Goodia astrica Darge, 1977
Goodia boulardi Rougeot, 1974
Goodia canui Bouyer, 2004
Goodia dimonica Darge, 2008
Goodia falcata (Aurivillius, 1893)
Goodia fulvescens Sonthonnax, 1898
Goodia hierax Jordan, 1922
Goodia hollandi Butler, 1898
Goodia lunata Holland, 1893
Goodia nodulifera (Karsch, 1892)
Goodia nubilata Holland, 1893
Goodia obscuripennis Strand, 1913
Goodia oriens Hampson, 1909
Goodia oxytela Jordan, 1922
Goodia pareensis (Darge, 2008)
Goodia perfulvastra Darge, 1994
Goodia sentosa Jordan, 1922
Goodia smithi (Holland, 1892)
Goodia sparsum (Darge, 2008)
Goodia stellata Darge, 1994
Goodia thia Jordan, 1922
Goodia unguiculata Bouvier, 1936

References

Saturniinae